In law and philosophy, accommodationism is the co-existence of religion with rationalism or irreligion. It may be applied to government practice or to society more broadly. Accommodationist policies are common in liberal democracies as a method of guaranteeing freedom of religion, and these policies may include options for religious education, official recognition of certain religious practices, and tolerance of religious expression in public spaces. It contrasts with separationist secularism and fundamentalism.

By location

Europe 
Germany provides financial support for religious organizations. Teaching of religion is permitted in schools, but students have the right to choose the type of religious instruction, if any. In Albania, accommodationism is associated with long standing Islamic traditions in the country and Sufism in particular, while it's opposed by neo-fundamentalist groups and the Salafi movement in particular.

In the United Kingdom, accommodationism is relevant to the role of the Church of England and the debate over disestablishmentarianism.

India 
India adopted accommodationism in its Constitution in 1947, supported by secularists such as Mahatma Gandhi, Jawaharlal Nehru, and B. R. Ambedkar. The government administrates religious instruction in schools, funds religious organizations, and does not regulate religious activity. Muslims are not strictly bound by the law of India and are permitted to operate separately under a Sharia system.

United States 

The United States has a history of accommodationism originating from its founding. The First Amendment to the United States Constitution guarantees that "Congress shall make no law respecting an establishment of religion, or prohibiting the free exercise thereof." Accommodationist policy in the United States often pertains to religion in schools; public schools in the United States cannot sponsor or endorse religion, but parochial schools are permitted to exist and receive government support. Religious practices have been recognized and adopted by law, including Christmas as a federal holiday since 1870 (at first applicable only to federal employees in the District of Columbia, extended in 1885 to all federal employees) and In God We Trust as the national motto since 1956.  The Supreme Court of the United States has ruled in favor of an accommodationist interpretation of the amendment numerous times, both implicitly and explicitly.

See also 

 Faith and rationality
 Religion in politics
 Religious pluralism
 Separation of church and state
 Syncretism

References 

Religion and politics
Separation of church and state
Philosophy of religion